De Wolfe, DeWolfe, or de Volfe is a surname.

People
Barbara DeWolfe (1912–2008), American ornithologist
Billy De Wolfe (1907–1974), American actor
Chris DeWolfe (born 1966), American entrepreneur
Elsie de Wolfe (1859–1950), American actress, interior decorator, and society figure
Harry DeWolf (1903–2000), Canadian naval officer during the Second World War
James P. deWolfe (1896–1966), American Episcopal priest and bishop
Roland De Wolfe (born 1979), British professional poker player

See also
DeWolf (disambiguation)
DeWolf family
De Wolf
Dewolfe
De Wolfe Music - British production music company, originator of library music.
Wolf (name)
Wolfe (surname)

Wulf,  common Germanic name element